The Turkish Cypriot football system is divided into the following leagues.

Promotion and relegation can occur through every league. This means a club in the BTM 2. Lig may be promoted to the top flight KTFF Süper Lig.

See also
League system

References

External links
Cyprus Turkish Football Association official website

Cyprus, Northern